The Forgotten One (also known as Hero and Gilgamesh) is a fictional character appearing in American comic books published by Marvel Comics. He first appeared in The Eternals #13 (July 1977) and was created by Jack Kirby. He is a member of the near-immortal hidden race known as the Eternals. He has also been a member of the Avengers.

Don Lee portrayed Gilgamesh in the Marvel Cinematic Universe, debuting in Eternals (2021).

Publication history

The Forgotten One was created by Jack Kirby, and first appeared in The Eternals #13 (July 1977).

Fictional character biography
During his millennia of activity, the adventurer and warrior Forgotten One has used the names of or been mistaken for numerous heroes of myth and legend, including Gilgamesh and Hercules. He became an outcast from his fellow Eternals when their ruler, Zuras, decreed that he had been too proud a meddler in the mortal world and confined him to a sector of Olympus. Eventually the Eternal known as Sprite convinced him to come out of exile and journey to the mother-ship of the Fourth Host of the Celestials to assist the Eternals in battle against the Deviants.

After this battle, he was renamed Hero by the One Above All, the chief of the alien Celestials, who had created the Eternals and Deviants. After losing a battle with Thor, Hero and the other Eternals assisted Thor in battling the host of the Celestials to prevent them from destroying humanity. Hero also fought Hercules.

Hero later became known as the Forgotten One.  He helped the other Eternals in battle against Ghaur.

Later, when the membership of the Avengers had been virtually emptied, the Forgotten One joined them for a time. He renamed himself Gilgamesh, donning a costume that resembled the hide of the Bull of Heaven and went to work as a monster-slayer. He assisted the Avengers in battles against the Growing Man, Nanny, the Orphan-Maker and N'astirh's demons. He participated in the Avengers' battle against Supernova and helped them fight the U-Foes. He assisted the Avengers in their struggle with the Lava Men, and was somehow severely injured during the battle. Gilgamesh was brought to the Eternals' home of Olympia, which had temporarily fallen into the Negative Zone, to recover from his injuries. There, he fought against Blastaar, who had temporarily disintegrated the other Eternals. Gilgamesh left the Avengers at that time, as his essence had been bound to Olympus. He later recovered from his injuries and defeated B'Gon the sorcerer, thereby winning a reputation as a hero on modern day Earth. Gilgamesh was later seen among the superhumans selected by Her as potential mates.

He returned to the Avengers Mansion during "The Crossing", a crossover, only to be killed by Neut, an agent of the time traveler Immortus, who was at the time disguised as Kang the Conqueror. It was later shown that Gilgamesh is alive, and once again associated with his fellow Eternals. He had lost his memory because a reality change created by Sprite. He was living as circus' strongman in Brazil. He was fooled by Ajak in killing Makkari and damaging the Eternals' resurrection machine. Later, he team up with Hercules and after that, he travelled to Deviant Lemuria, where he helped Thor, who was fighting the deviants led by Ghaur.

Powers and abilities
The Forgotten One is a member of the Eternal race, and possesses a number of superhuman abilities common to the Eternals, but has trained some of them far beyond the norm. While the exact limits are unknown, his immense, superhuman strength makes him the physically strongest of all known Eternals, save for Thanos. His strength has been shown to rival that of Thor, and Hercules.

Like all other Eternals, The Forgotten One is virtually immortal. He has not aged since reaching adulthood and he is immune to all known diseases; his body is also highly durable and resistant to physical injury. He is capable of withstanding high caliber bullets, falls from great heights, powerful concussive forces, and temperature extremes, all without being injured. However, it is possible to injure him by disrupting the mental discipline that he maintains over his body. This ability allows him to control every molecule in his body, which in turn allows him to regenerate any damaged or destroyed tissue. However, should his mental discipline be broken, it is possible to permanently injure or kill him.

Other abilities that he has in common with most other Eternals include the power to levitate himself and/or fly at great speed, project beams of concussive force or heat from his eyes and hands, and the power to manipulate matter. To what degree these powers have been developed in comparison with other Eternals isn't known, but the first two have been stated as presumed to be average. He also has highly developed senses that helped to compensate for his former blindness, enabling him to be an excellent hunter and tracker.

The Forgotten One is one of the most accomplished hand-to-hand combatants among the Eternals. He possesses an extraordinary melee capacity, with knowledge of most methods of hand-to-hand combat known in ancient Earth civilizations.  He sometimes wears battle armor of unknown composition, and usually arms himself with simple hand weapons such as an axe, spear, or club.

Other characters
Other characters have used the identity of either Gilgamesh or Hero.  These include:
The Eternal Warrior was called Gilgamesh in Marvel Preview #12.
Jimmy Rogers created Hero to save him from monsters in Venus #17.

Reception
Newsarama ranked the character, as Gilgamesh, as the second worst Avengers member commenting: "What's that you say? You aren't familiar with Gilgamesh, the ancient Sumerian hero? And why is this guy wearing a cow on his head? Let's just say there's a reason this guy is called "The Forgotten One". Maybe next time you can get Mithras, or at least Marduk".

In 2021, CBR.com ranked Gilgamesh 9th in their "15 Most Powerful Eternals" list.

In 2021, Screen Rant ranked The Forgotten One 3rd in their "10 Most Powerful Members Of The Eternals" list

In 2021, CBR.com ranked Gilgamesh 8th in their "10 Strongest Characters From Eternals Comics" list.

In other media

Film 
 Gilgamesh appears in Eternals, portrayed by Don Lee. This version has a close relationship with Thena and keeps an eye on her when she develops Mahd Wy'ry. During the events of the film, Gilgamesh partakes in getting the Eternals back together to combat the Deviants. Gilgamesh is later killed in battle by Kro who gains a humanoid form. Before succumbing to his injuries, Gilgamesh tells Thena to remember who she is.

Video game 
 Gilgamesh appears as an unlockable playable character in Marvel Future Fight.
 Gilgamesh appears as a companion character in Marvel Future Revolution.

See also
 Gilgamesh (Sumerian demigod)

References

External links

Forgotten One at marvel.com
 

Characters created by Jack Kirby
Comics characters introduced in 1977
Cultural depictions of Gilgamesh
Eternals (comics)
Fictional blind characters
Fictional characters with superhuman durability or invulnerability
Marvel Comics characters who can move at superhuman speeds
Marvel Comics characters with accelerated healing
Marvel Comics characters with superhuman strength
Marvel Comics male superheroes